Perry County Municipal Airport  is seven miles northeast of Tell City, in Perry County, Indiana. It is owned by the Perry County Airport Authority.

Most U.S. airports use the same three-letter location identifier for the FAA and IATA, but this airport is TEL to the FAA and has no IATA code.

Facilities
It is untowered, and has one runway, 13/31, that is 4,400 x 75 ft (1,341 x 23 m) asphalt. In the 12 month period ending in December 2019, 14 aircraft were based out of the field, all being single engine light aircraft. Aircraft operations averaged 62 per week, with 65% local general aviation, 27% transient general aviation, 7% military and <1% air taxi, totaling 3,232 operations.

References

External links 

Airports in Indiana
Transportation buildings and structures in Perry County, Indiana